Maurice Blayne was Dean of St Asaph from 5 August 1557 until 27 February 1559.

References 

16th-century Welsh Anglican priests
Deans of St Asaph